Paul-Alfred Isautier (29 June 1911 - 5 September 1984) was a Réunion politician. He served in the Senate of France from 1959 until 1974.

References
Paul-Alfred Isautier at the Senate of France website

French Senators of the Fifth Republic
1911 births
1984 deaths
Politicians of Réunion
Senators of Réunion